Jalaun district is a district of Uttar Pradesh, India. The district is named after the town of Jalaun, which was the former headquarters of a Maratha governor, but the administrative headquarters of the district is at Orai. Other major towns in the district are Konch, Kalpi, and Madhogarh.

Geography
Jalaun District is a part of the Jhansi Division. The district has an area of 4,565 km², and a population of 1,689,974 (2011 census), and a population density of 370 persons per km².

The district lies entirely within the level plains of Bundelkhand, north of the hill country, and is almost surrounded by the Yamuna River, which forms the northern boundary of the district, and its tributaries the Betwa, which forms the southern boundary of the district, and the Pahuj, which forms the western boundary. The central region thus enclosed is a dead level of cultivated land, almost destitute of trees, and dotted with villages. The southern portion presents an almost unbroken sheet of cultivation. The Non River flows through the centre of the district, which it drains by numerous small ravines.

The districts of Etawah and Kanpur lie to the north across the Yamuna, while Hamirpur District lies to the east and southeast, Jhansi District lies to the southeast, and Bhind District of Madhya Pradesh lies to the west cross the Pahuj.

The district has been under severe drought for the last four years with the average rainfall being about 399 mm which is way behind the average of about 800 mm.

Economy
In 2006 the Ministry of Panchayati Raj named the district of Jalaun as one of the country's 250 most backward districts (out of a total of 640). It is one of the 34 districts in Uttar Pradesh currently receiving funds from the Backward Regions Grant Fund Programme (BRGF).

Matar Mahotsav
District Jalaun for the first time celebrated Matar Mahotsav (Pea Festival) from 4/1/2022 to 6/1/2022. The Mahotsav was held at Medical College Orai.
Matar or Pea is the District’s entry under District’s ODOP (One District One Product) scheme. Also the District boasts of 31.26% of its arable land being utilized for Matar production. The District also houses 5 cold storages dedicated to Matar. This festival was hence organized to celebrate Farmers who have made immense contribution to District’s Agriculture and economy. The event had stalls of various agro friendly products viz organic fertilizers, soil enriching organic products and also display of various varieties of Pea produced in the District. There were stalls which showcased delicacies with matar as major ingredient were organinzed to give the uninitiated a taste of Orai’s matar cuisine. Moreover scientists across the state held a one to one session with farmers as well as traders educating them on various aspects ranging from reaping til sowing of the crop, soil health, pest and disease control. The farmers as well as traders were made aware of agricultural practices that could boost their earnings and trade. The farmers queries were answered via a two hour long QnA session as well.  The farmers and traders were presented mementos, souvenirs for their unparalleled role in Agriculture economy of the state. Hence the festival stood true to its 3A objective of Agriculture, Awareness and Appreciation.

Demographics

According to the 2011 census Jalaun district has a population of 1,689,974, roughly equal to the nation of Guinea-Bissau or the US state of Idaho. This gives it a ranking of 296th in India (out of a total of 640). 
Its population growth rate over the decade 2001–2011 was 14.87%. Jalaun has a sex ratio of 865 females for every 1000 males, and a literacy rate of 75.16%. Scheduled Castes made up 27.70% of the population. The largest city in the district is Orai, followed by Konch as per report released by Census, 2011.

At the time of the 2011 Census of India, 96.64% of the population in the district spoke Hindi, 2.01% Bundeli and 1.30% Urdu as their first language.

Gallery

Medical College
Government Medical College, Jalaun is a government medical college located in Orai of Jalaun district.

Villages
 

Jugiyapur
Pachokhara

See also
Jagmanpur, Kanar

References

External links

Jalaun District on Bundelkhanddarshan.com 
 

 
Districts of Uttar Pradesh